Arthur George Green FRS  (1864 – 12 September 1941) was a British organic chemist.

Career
He was educated at Lancing College and University College London. In 1887, Green was working in London for the Brooke, Simpson and Spiller company when he discovered the aniline based dye primuline. In 1894, Green accepted a job with the Clayton Aniline Company as manager of their dyestuff department, a post he held until 1901. From 1902 until 1916, he was Professor of Tinctorial Chemistry at the University of Leeds. In 1916, Green joined the Levinstein company as Director of Research. He resigned from the company in 1923.

Awards
In 1915, Green was elected a Fellow of the Royal Society and awarded the gold medal of the Worshipful Company of Dyers. In 1917, he was a recipient of the Perkin Medal from the Society of Dyers and Colourists.

References

1864 births
1941 deaths
People educated at Lancing College
Alumni of University College London
British chemists
Organic chemists
Academics of the University of Leeds
Place of birth missing
Fellows of the Royal Society